Chief of the Armed Forces may refer to:
 Chief of the Armed Forces (France), the commander-in-chief of the French Military, a role vested in the President of France
 Chief of the Armed Forces (Switzerland), the commander of the Swiss Armed Forces in times of peace

See also 
 Armed forces (disambiguation)
 Chief of the Defence Staff (disambiguation)
 Chief of the General Staff